The Southern Reporter, the Southern Reporter Second, and the Southern Reporter Third are United States regional case law reporters.  It is part of the National Reporter System created by John B. West for the West Publishing Company.

The Southern Reporter contains published appellate court case decisions for:
 Alabama
 Florida
 Louisiana
 Mississippi

When cited, the Southern Reporter, the Southern Reporter Second, and the Southern Reporter Third are abbreviated "So.", "So. 2d", and "So. 3d", respectively.

References

National Reporter System